Patiabad (also Romanized as Patīābād; also known as Fārājulābak, Kūr Bolāgh-e Deh-e Farajollāh, Kūr Bolāgh-e Farajollāh Beygī, Kūr Bolāgh-e Patīābād, Kūr Bolāgh-e Soflá, Kūrbolāgh Parīābād, and Kurbulāk) is a village in Baladarband Rural District, in the Central District of Kermanshah County, Kermanshah Province, Iran. At the 2006 census, its population was 58, in 14 families.

References 

Populated places in Kermanshah County